The 1923 Milwaukee Badgers season was their second in the National Football League. The team improved on their previous league record of 2–4–3, winning 7 games. They tied for third place in the league.

Schedule

Standings

References

Milwaukee Badgers seasons
Milwaukee Badgers
Milwaukee Badgers